Anna Marie Mathew Vetticad is an Indian journalist, film critic, and cultural commentator. She has been in the field of journalism since 1994. Vetticad is known for her political critiques of Indian cinema and the Indian film industry. She is an advocate for women's empowerment and the representation of marginalised communities in popular entertainment.

Early life 
Vetticad was born to Malayali parents in Delhi. She completed her schooling from the Convent of Jesus and Mary, Delhi.

Career 
She has worked with India Today (1994–2002) and The Indian Express (2002–2005) before switching to television. She worked with Headlines Today till 2011. She lives in Delhi with her family. She also used to write columns in leading magazines and newspapers, including India Today, The New Indian Express, The Indian Express, and The Hindu. She was a visiting faculty of the Indian Institute of Mass Communication, Delhi.

Vetticad is the author of the book The Adventures of an Intrepid Film Critic (2012), an overview of Indian society as seen through the prism of the Hindi film industry and presented through an account of a year in which she watched every single Hindi film released in India’s National Capital Region. The book features a Foreword by Ranbir Kapoor.

In 2016, she was the recipient of the Ramnath Goenka Excellence in Journalism Award in the Commentary and Interpretative Writing category for her monthly column "Film Fatale" in The Hindu Businessline.

References

External links 
 

English-language writers from India
Year of birth missing (living people)
Malayali people
Indian film critics
Indian women journalists
Living people
Journalists from Delhi
Indian women critics
Indian newspaper journalists
Women writers from Delhi
21st-century Indian journalists
21st-century Indian women writers